= Shelar =

- Census town
- Location in Maharashtra, India
- Coordinates: 19.3259°N 73.0626°E
- Country: India
- State: Maharashtra
- District: Thane

Population (2001)
  - Total: 10,615

Languages
  - Official: Marathi
- Time zone: UTC+5:30 (IST)

Shelar is a census town in Thane district in the Indian state of Maharashtra.

== Demographics ==
As of 2001 India census, Shelar had a population of 10,615. Males constitute 62% of the population and females 38%. Shelar has an average literacy rate of 64%, higher than the national average of 59.5%: male literacy is 73%, and female literacy is 49%. In Shelar, 16% of the population is under 6 years of age.
